The Arrondissement of Mons is one of the seven administrative arrondissements in the Walloon province of Hainaut, Belgium.

It is both an administrative and a judicial arrondissement. However, the Judicial Arrondissement of Mons also comprises all municipalities of the Arrondissement of Soignies but one (Lessines), as well as the municipalities of Brugelette en Chièvres of the Arrondissement of Ath.

Municipalities

The Administrative Arrondissement of Mons consists of the following municipalities:
 Boussu
 Colfontaine
 Dour
 Frameries
 Hensies
 Honnelles
 Jurbise
 Lens
 Mons
 Quaregnon
 Quévy
 Quiévrain
 Saint-Ghislain

References

Mons